The Atlantic Coast Conference Athlete of the Year award is given to the male and female athlete who show extraordinary talent throughout the entire season. The award is decided by members of the Atlantic Coast Sports Media Association.

Anthony J. McKevlin Award
The Anthony J. McKevlin Award, which originally went to the league's athlete of the year regardless of gender until 1990, named in honor of a former sports editor of the Raleigh News and Observer, has been voted upon and handed out annually since the ACC was formed in 1953–1954.

Mary Garber Award
In 1990, The Mary Garber Award, named in honor of Mary Garber, a former Winston-Salem Journal reporter and a pioneer for women in the field of sports journalism, was established to honor the league's top female athlete. In 2005, the Associated Press Sports Editors (APSE) distinguished Garber by honoring her with its prestigious Red Smith Award, making her the first female recipient in the award's 25-year history.

Recipients

See also
Atlantic Coast Conference
 ACC Men's Basketball Player of the Year
 NCAA Woman of the Year Award
 List of awards honoring women

References

Athlete of the Year
College conference trophies and awards in the United States
Most valuable player awards